Nigel Bond (born 15 November 1965) is an English former professional snooker player.

Bond competed on the main tour from 1989 to 2022, and was ranked within the world's top 16 players between 1992 and 1999, peaking at 5th for the 1996–97 season. He reached the final of the World Championship in 1995, where he lost 9–18 to Stephen Hendry. He won the 1996 British Open, defeating John Higgins 9–8.

Having reached three other ranking tournament finals, Bond won the 2011 Snooker Shoot-Out and, in 2012, defeated Tony Chappel to win the World Seniors Championship. He fell off the tour following his loss to Lukas Kleckers in the second qualifying round for the 2022 World Championship, and subsequently announced his retirement.

Career
Bond was born in Darley Dale, Derbyshire.

After a strong amateur career, Bond turned professional for the 1989–1990 season. He reached his first ranking semi-final in his first season, and his first final in his second season, but his career peaked in the mid-1990s. In the 1994 World Championship, Bond pulled off one of the biggest comebacks in the event's history, rallying from 9–2 to defeat Cliff Thorburn 10–9 in what would be Thorburn's final appearance at the Crucible. A year later, Bond reached the final after beating Stephen Lee, Alan McManus, Gary Wilkinson and Andy Hicks, but lost to Stephen Hendry 18–9. This was his only semi-final run of the season. As a consequence of reaching the final, he climbed to number 5 in the world rankings for 1996/97, and in that same season he acquired his only ranking tournament victory (after three previous losing finals), the British Open, beating John Higgins 9–8 after needing a snooker in the final frame, winning the World Snooker Association Performance of the Year award for this achievement, although he has failed to maintain this level of performance.
He reached at least the quarter finals at the Crucible Theatre every year from 1993 to 1996, losing to Stephen Hendry every time, which added extra spice to their first round match in 2006. After leading comfortably throughout the match Bond was pegged back to 7–7, and the match went to a final frame. With only the black remaining, and 7 points up, Bond clipped it into the left corner pocket, only for the cue ball to go  in the right middle pocket, resulting in a respotted black (the first one ever to decide the final frame of a World Championship match), which Bond potted to take frame and match. Final score 10–9, Bond's first win at the Crucible since 1999, and his only last-16 run of that season.

By the end of the 1990s, Bond was out of the top 16, and dropped out of the top 32 for the 2004–2005 season. However, he reclaimed his place a year later, and remained there until 2010. In the 2007 World Championship he lost in the first round, 10–7 to Peter Ebdon.

A run to the last 16 of the 2007 UK Championships,
in which he came from 5–7 to win 9–7 against Ken Doherty in the last 32 before losing 9–6 to Ding Junhui in the last 16, was a precursor to his first quarter-final run for 5 years, at the China Open. Victories over David Roe, Stephen Lee and Barry Pinches took him to a meeting with Stephen Maguire, which he lost 5–0.

He opened the 2008–09 season with first-round defeats in the first five tournaments, but victory over Ebdon in the first round of the World Championship ensured that he didn't lose his top 32 status. This was, however, his last appearance at the main stages of the World Championship.

On 30 January 2011, Bond won the Snooker Shoot-Out event. This involved the top 64 players in the world playing 10-minute matches decided on a single frame. He picked up the £32,000 prize money as well as the Snooker Shoot-Out trophy, beating Robert Milkins 58–24 in the final.

Bond started the 2011–12 season very well by qualifying for the first two ranking event tournaments, the Australian Goldfields Open and the Shanghai Masters. He lost to Neil Robertson and Mark Selby respectively in the first round. He also qualified for the World Open, but was defeated by amateur player Lu Ning in the wildcard round. Bond finished the season ranked world number 45.

Bond once again qualified for the Australian Goldfields Open in the 2012–13 season, but lost to Neil Robertson 1–5 in the last 32. In December, he reached the World Open in Haikou, China, with wins over Jimmy White and Jamie Burnett. At the venue he saw off Zhu Yinghui 5–3 in the wildcard round and received a bye through to the last 16 due to the withdrawal of Ali Carter. There he lost 1–5 to Judd Trump. Bond was also crowned World Seniors champion during the season without dropping a frame in a total of seven matches, concluding with a 2–0 victory against Tony Chappel in the final. Bond's season ended when he was beaten 8–10 by Alan McManus in the third round of World Championship Qualifying. He dropped a solitary place during the year to end it ranked world number 46.

Bond reached the final of the World Seniors Championship for the second year in a row in the 2013–14 season, losing 2–1 to Steve Davis. He only won two matches at the main venue of ranking events all season, his best run coming in the China Open, where he beat Barry Pinches 5–2 before Mark Selby defeated Bond 5–1 in the last 32. He fell 11 spots from the start of the season to end it as the world number 57.

Bond produced a comeback in the second round of the 2014 UK Championship, as from 5–0 down against world number five Barry Hawkins he took six successive frames to advance. However, in the third round Anthony McGill recovered from 4–1 down to eliminate Bond 6–5. The furthest Bond could progress in a ranking event this season was at the Indian Open, where he beat Ryan Day 4–1 and Dechawat Poomjaeng 4–3, before losing 4–1 to Chris Wakelin in the last 16. He just fell outside the top 64 at the end of the year as he was 65th, but Bond earned a two-year extension via the European Order of Merit.

At the 2016 Indian Open Bond defeated Ricky Walden 4–1, Sam Baird 4–2, John Astley 4–2 and Peter Ebdon 4–3 to reach his first ranking event semi-final since 2002, where he lost 4–1 to Kyren Wilson. Bond had started practicing at the Snooker Academy in Sheffield with young Chinese players and stated that this has contributed to him regaining the hunger and passion to play snooker. He would have a losing run of 10 successive matches shortly afterwards, but at the Gibraltar Open he beat five players to reach his second semi-final of the season, where he failed to pick up a frame in a defeat to Shaun Murphy. Bond kept his place on the tour through the one-year ranking list.

Personal life 
Bond is married to Karen and they have one son.

Performance and rankings timeline

Career finals

Ranking finals: 5 (1 title)

Minor-ranking finals: 1

Non-ranking finals: 11 (8 titles)

Pro-am finals: 4 (1 title)

Amateur finals: 1 (1 title)

References

External links

 
Nigel Bond at worldsnooker.com

1965 births
Living people
English snooker players
People from Darley Dale
Sportspeople from Derbyshire
World Games gold medalists
Competitors at the 2009 World Games
World champions in snooker